Daria J. Willis is an American academic administrator and historian. She is the incoming president of Howard Community College. Willis was president of Everett Community College from 2019 to 2021. She is the first African American president at both institutions. Willis was an assistant professor of history in the Lone Star College System.

Education 
Willis is from Atlanta. When she was six, her father died from AIDS. She completed high school in three years. Willis completed a bachelor's in African American studies and a master's degree in applied social science at Florida A&M University. She earned a Ph.D. in history from Florida State University. Her 2012 dissertation about Adella Hunt was titled The life and times of Adella Hunt Logan: Educator, mother, wife, and suffragist, 1863–1915. Maxine D. Jones was Willis' doctoral advisor.

Career 
Willis was an adjunct professor of history at Tallahassee Community College. With the Lone Star College System, she was an assistant professor of history, faculty senate president, department chairwoman, and executive dean of centers. Willis was dean of academic studies at Lee College.

Willis joined the faculty at Onondaga Community College in July 2016. In Onondaga, she was provost and senior vice president for academic affairs. In 2018, Willis received a 40 under 40 award from the American Association for Women in Community Colleges. She chaired the NAACP education committee. On July 1, 2019, Willis became president of Everett Community College, succeeding Dave Beyer. She was the institution’s first African American president.

On November 5, 2021, Willis was announced as the incoming president of Howard Community College (HCC). She succeeds Kathleen Hetherington and interim president Lynn Coleman on January 10, 2022. Willis is the first African American to hold this position at HCC.

Personal life 
Willis had a daughter when she was 19. At the age of 21, she divorced her first husband. Willis is married to Isiah David Brown. They met in Tallahassee, FL. Willis has two daughters and a son.

References

External links

Living people
Year of birth missing (living people)
Place of birth missing (living people)
People from Atlanta
21st-century American historians
African-American academic administrators
Heads of universities and colleges in the United States
Women heads of universities and colleges
African-American historians
African-American women academic administrators
Onondaga Community College faculty
21st-century African-American women writers
21st-century American women writers
21st-century African-American writers
Florida A&M University alumni
Florida State University alumni